Jeeo Shaan Se is a 1997 Indian Hindi-language film directed by Talat Jani and produced by Pranlal Mehta, starring Dharmendra, Reena Roy, Ayub Khan and Monica Bedi. Dharmendra appears in a triple role.

Synopsis

The story of Jeeo Shaan Se revolves around two young college students, Kishan (Vikash Bhalla) and Govinda (Jay Mehta), who are led astray by the notion of free sex and are deeply involved in promiscuity. They freely play with innocent girls' virginity and publicly flaunt their intentions. The story takes a different turn when Kishan meets Radha (Shakshi Shivanad), who tries to correct his lustful activities. But his old habit returns in the company of his friend Govinda. Govinda, on the other hand is attracted to Sapna, but she turns out to be different from others of his abused girls and does not give in to his sexual advances. Instead,  he falls in love with Anamika (Shiba), only to find later that she is a whore. Enter another character, Gopala (Ayub Khan), who is also a friend of Govinda and Kishan, and loves Kiran (Monica Bedi), but she does not consider him to be her ideal partner. The story then takes a serious note as the three friends try to prove themselves worthy of the girls and win their hearts by changing their ways.

Cast

Dharmendra - Brahma, Vishnu, Mahesh
Reena Roy
Jay Mehta
Sakshi Shivanand
Vikas Bhalla
Ayub Khan
Monica Bedi
Sheeba
Mukesh Rishi
Rubina Khan
Navneet Nishan
Neena Gupta

Music

References

External links
 

1997 films
1990s Hindi-language films
Films directed by Talat Jani